Alessandro Puccini (born 28 August 1968) is an Italian fencer and Olympic champion in foil competition.

He competed at the 1992 Summer Olympics and he won a gold medal in the individual foil event at the 1996 Summer Olympics in Atlanta.

References

External links 
 
 
 
 
 

1968 births
Living people
Sportspeople from Pisa
Italian male fencers
Olympic fencers of Italy
Fencers at the 1992 Summer Olympics
Fencers at the 1996 Summer Olympics
Olympic gold medalists for Italy
Olympic medalists in fencing
Medalists at the 1996 Summer Olympics
Universiade medalists in fencing
Universiade silver medalists for Italy
Fencers of Centro Sportivo Carabinieri
Medalists at the 1991 Summer Universiade
Medalists at the 1993 Summer Universiade